Sweet Justice is an American legal drama television series created by John Romano and starring Cicely Tyson and Melissa Gilbert. The hour-long series ran from September 15, 1994, to August 12, 1995, on NBC. The series was produced by Trotwood Productions in association with Columbia Pictures Television.

Premise
Attorney Kate Delacroy (Melissa Gilbert) returns to New Orleans from Wall Street for her sister's engagement party and decides to stay. Instead of joining the prestigious law firm headed by her arch conservative father, James-Lee (Ronny Cox), she joins forces with old civil rights warrior Carrie Grace Battle (Cicely Tyson) in Battle-Ross & Associates, the better to take on cases of women's rights, minority rights, and everyone else's rights.

Cast and characters
Melissa Gilbert as Kate Delacroy, a novice Wall Street attorney 
Greg Germann as Andy Del Sarto, a passionate upstate attorney 
Cicely Tyson as Carrie Grace Battle, a feminist, civil rights lawyer and senior partner of a New Orleans law firm
Ronny Cox as James Lee Delacroy, Kate's father, a senior partner in the town's old-money-and-big business law firm 
Jason Gedrick as Bailey Connors, Kate's high school sweetheart, a journalist 
Cree Summer as Reese Daulkins, an energetic attorney and single mother
Jim Antonio as Ross A. Ross
Megan Gallivan as Anne Delacroy-Foley
Scott Paetty as Harry Foley
Marcia Strassman as Althea "Bunny" McClure 
John Allen Nelson as Logan WrightMichael Warren as Michael "T-Dog" Turner'''

Episodes

Awards and nominations
Tyson was nominated for an Emmy Award and a Screen Actors Guild Awards for her role on the series.

References

External links

1990s American drama television series
1994 American television series debuts
1995 American television series endings
1990s American legal television series
English-language television shows
NBC original programming
Television series by Sony Pictures Television
Television shows set in Louisiana